Kakinada district is a district in the Coastal Andhra Region in the Indian state of Andhra Pradesh. With Kakinada as its administrative headquarters, it was proposed on 26 January 2022 to become one of the resultant twenty six districts in the state after the final notification has been issued on 4 April 2022 by the government of Andhra Pradesh. The district was formed from Kakinada and Peddapuram revenue divisions from East Godavari district. Incidentally, during earlier times, the region comprising towns Pithapuram, Kakinada and Peddapuram were referred as Polnaud or Prolunadu, which now roughly corresponds to the areas in this district.

Etymology 
This district name derives from its headquarters Kakinada.

Geography 
This district is surrounded by North of Alluri Sitharama Raju district, South of Bay of Bengal & Yanam district, East of Anakapalli district and west of East Godavari district & Konaseema district.

Administrative divisions 

The district has two revenue divisions, namely Kakinada and Peddapuram, each headed by a sub collector. These revenue divisions are divided into 21 mandals.

Mandals 

There are 10 mandals in Kakinada division and 11 in Peddapuram division. The 21 mandals under their revenue divisions are listed below:

Cities and towns

Politics 

There is 1 parliamentary and 7 assembly constituencies in Kakinada district. The parliamentary constituencies are 
The assembly constituencies are

Demographics

At the time of the 2011 census, Kakinada district had a population of 20,92,374, of which 662,726 (31.67%) lived in urban areas. The district had a sex ratio of 1007 females per 1000 males. Scheduled Castes and Scheduled Tribes make up 3,31,103 (15.82%) and 30,803 (1.47%) of the population respectively.

At the time of the 2011 census, 98.41% of the population spoke Telugu and 1.14% Urdu as their first language.

References 

Districts of Andhra Pradesh
2022 establishments in Andhra Pradesh